Orokonui Ecosanctuary, called Te Korowai o Mihiwaka in Māori, is an ecological island wildlife reserve developed by the Otago Natural History Trust in the Orokonui Valley between Waitati and Pūrākaunui, New Zealand,  to the north of central Dunedin.

History and planning

Formation of the trust

The idea of a sanctuary near Dunedin was first discussed in 1982 by New Zealand cartoonist Burton Silver and a few friends. The group made a proposal in July 1983 to convert a Dunedin fertiliser factory into a giant aviary. The proposal was later abandoned but inspired the formation in August 1983 of a charitable trust, the Otago Natural History Trust.
Their initial proposal for a sanctuary at Orokonui lapsed and the group disbanded for a while until 1995, when the Karori Wildlife Sanctuary opened in Wellington. This gave the idea renewed impetus and a remaining trust member, Ralph Allen revived the proposal. The local Maori Runaka, Kati Huirapa of Puketeraki became supporters of the trust.

Site

The New Zealand Department of Conservation approved the trust's use of the land and completed a heads of agreement and the Orokonui site was visited on 27 April 2006 by Chris Carter, the New Zealand Minister of Conservation. The trust purchased and added a further  of adjacent land to the Conservation Area.

In May 2007, the trust announced  that the sanctuary might expand in future onto adjacent public land.

Fundraising
A fundraising appeal was launched in November 2005.
The trust ran two public fundraising campaigns in 2006-2007: the public were urged to donate their soon-to-be-withdrawn New Zealand 5-cent coins while a "sponsor a fencepost" campaign was run in conjunction with the Otago Daily Times newspaper.

The trust also has a number of mostly Dunedin-based businesses and charities as sponsors. The major funders are a local gambling organisation and the Otago Regional Council.

Construction and development

Enclosure
It uses stainless steel mesh that continues down to form a skirt at ground level that prevents animals from burrowing under it. On the top is a curved steel hood that prevents climbing animals like cats and possums from climbing over the top.

Waterways are protected by screened culverts nicknamed "watergates", while pedestrian access is by airlock style double gates.

The additional land was mainly pine plantation but considered to be of benefit as the trees when felled would give a good habitat for huhu grubs, an important food source for kākā.

Earthworks for the fence were finished in May 2007. The fence was completed and the sanctuary officially "closed" on 3 July 2007 in the presence of the Waitati Militia.

Pest eradication
Pest eradication commenced in August 2007 with shooting of goats and 800
possums by ground-based teams. This was immediately followed by the scattering from aircraft of bait poisoned with brodifacoum into the fenced area.
The trust's consent application states that when the valley is free of pests, the health of the forest will improve, leading to an increase in seedlings, flowers, seeds, invertebrates and thus increased food supply to birds (p4). There is some evidence that forest health is improving.

Habitat improvement
Other work involves planting of native seedlings raised at a nearby tree nursery and piling up rocks to create habitats for lizards.

Species introduction

The trust plans to "bring back to the ecosanctuary native species that would have been there in times past" including kiwi, seabirds, kākāriki, South Island robin, South Island saddleback, kākā, native bats, tuatara and jewelled gecko.
In July 2007, four South Island kākā arrived. Initially housed in an aviary, these were the first animals to be introduced to the Ecosanctuary.
Pūkeko and paradise duck have self-introduced since enclosure and habitat works. Fifteen tuatara were moved from the University of Otago in March 2009, and 34 South Island saddleback were introduced to the sanctuary the following month. The Ecosanctuary is also home to a breeding pair of South Island takahē, Quammen and Paku.

Visitor facilities
The promoters of the sanctuary anticipate 25,000 visitors per year. Following considerable debate they chose a site at the top of the valley system for visitor facilities, for its potential to attract visitors, its access and perceived low costs and "benefits for management of both ecology and
visitors". Here they built a NZD1.9 million visitor and education centre which they label as being a "showpiece of environmentally sustainable design".

The chosen site "is on a road that is likely to become part of the
Southern Scenic Route, with relatively slow-moving traffic that will
be able to see the visitor centre and stop to investigate", with road links to Port Chalmers, Waitati, Dunedin and State Highway 1.

Land history
The Orokonui Valley was once part of a hospital farm. It was previously cut-over and grazed, and parts of it planted in Eucalyptus regnans, one of which is New Zealand's tallest measured tree, the  "Frank Pepers Tree". The former hospital property was divided. The agricultural land was vested in Landcorp and the major part of the land was managed as the Orokonui Conservation Area by DOC.

References

External links
 Otago Natural History Trust - administrators of the Orokonui Ecosanctuary

Protected areas of Otago
Nature reserves in New Zealand
Wildlife sanctuaries of New Zealand
Tourist attractions in Dunedin